Tokuda Station (徳田駅) is the name of two train stations in Japan:

 Tokuda Station (Ishikawa)
 Tokuda Station (Mie)